Beledweyne bombing or Beledweyne attack may refer to:

 2009 Beledweyne bombing
 2013 Beledweyne attacks
 February 2022 Beledweyne bombing
 March 2022 Somalia attacks
 October 2022 Beledweyne bombings

See also 
 2022 Beledweyne bombings (disambiguation)